Alphaville Amiga Compilation (1988) was released under the Amiga label; it was exclusive to the former East Germany, where Forever Young and Afternoons in Utopia weren't easily available. Two songs submitted for the compilation, "To Germany with Love" and "Summer in Berlin," were rejected by the label for political reasons.

Track listing
 "Big in Japan" - 4:43
 "Forever Young" - 3:45
 "Sounds Like a Melody" - 4:42
 "The Jet Set" - 4:52
 "Lies" - 3:32
 "A Victory of Love" - 4:14
 "Dance with Me" - 3:59
 "Sensations" - 4:24
 "Carol Masters" - 4:32
 "Universal Daddy" - 3:57
 "Fantastic Dream" - 3:56
 "Red Rose" - 4:05

References

Alphaville (band) albums
1988 compilation albums
1988 albums